Biran Basnet (born 20 October 1994) is a Bhutanese international footballer, currently playing as a midfielder for Thimphu City  in the Bhutan Super League.

Club career
Basnet began his career at Druk Star, though given that they were not relegated from the A-Division in 2010 but did not partake in the 2011 season, it is unclear what level of football he was playing. He moved from Thimphu to Ugyen Academy in Punakha in 2012 and won the National League in 2013. Following the national title, he played in the 2014 AFC President's Cup, taking part in the 1–0 loss to Sri Lanka's Air Force SC, the 3–0 loss to Pakistan's KRL F.C. and the 4–0 loss to Bangladesh's Sheikh Russel KC.

International career
He made his first appearance for the Bhutan national football team in 2012 in the 5–0 friendly defeat to Thailand. He next played for Bhutan in their 3–0 loss to Afghanistan in the 2013 SAFF Championship group stage. He was also an unused substitute in the other two group matches, the 8–2 loss to the Maldives and the 5–2 loss to Sri Lanka

International goals
Scores and results list the Bhutan's goal tally first.

References

Bhutanese footballers
Bhutan international footballers
Bhutanese people of Nepalese descent
Living people
1994 births
Association football midfielders
Expatriate footballers in India
Bhutanese expatriate sportspeople in India